The Battle of Torvioll, also known as the Battle of Lower Dibra, was fought on 29 June 1444 on the Plain of Torvioll, in what is modern-day Albania. Gjergj Kastrioti Skanderbeg was an Ottoman Albanian general who decided to go back to his native land and take the reins of a new Albanian League against the Ottoman Empire. He, along with 300 other Albanians fighting at the Battle of Niš, deserted the Ottoman army to head towards Krujë, which fell quickly through a subversion. He then formed the League of Lezhë, a confederation of Albanian princes united in war against the Ottoman Empire. Murad II, realizing the threat, sent one of his most experienced captains, Ali Pasha, to crush the new state with a force of 40,000 men.

Skanderbeg expected a reaction so he moved with 15,000 of his own men to defeat Ali Pasha's army. The two met in the Plain of Torvioll where they camped opposite of each other. The following day, 29 June, Ali came out of his camp and saw that Skanderbeg had positioned his forces at the bottom of a hill. Expecting a quick victory, Ali ordered all of his forces down the hill to attack and defeat Skanderbeg's army. Skanderbeg expected such a maneuver and had prepared his own stratagem. Once the opposing forces were engaged and the necessary positioning was achieved, Skanderbeg ordered his forces hidden in the forests behind the Ottoman army to strike their rear. The result was devastating for the Ottomans, whose entire army was routed and its commander nearly killed.

The victory lifted the morale of the Christian princes of Europe and was recognized as a great victory over the Muslim Ottoman Empire. On the Ottoman side, Murad realized the effect Skanderbeg's coalition of Albanian nobles would have on his realm and continued to take measures to defeat him, resulting in twenty-five years of war against Skanderbeg himself and 37 years of war against the League of Lezhë in which in most battles the Albanians would be victorious.

Background
Gjergj Kastrioti Skanderbeg, the son of the powerful prince Gjon Kastrioti, had been a vassal of the Ottoman Empire as a sipahi, or cavalry commander. After his participation in the Ottoman loss at the Battle of Niš, Skanderbeg deserted the Ottoman army and rushed to Albania alongside 300 other Albanians. By forging a letter from Murad II to the Governor of Krujë, he became lord of the city in November 1443. Hungarian captain John Hunyadi's continued operations against Sultan Murad II gave Skanderbeg time to prepare an alliance of the Albanian nobles. Skanderbeg invited all of Albania's nobles to meet in the Venetian-held town of Alessio (Lezhë) on 2 March 1444. Alessio was chosen as the meeting point because the town had once been the capital of the Dukagjini family and to induce Venice to lend aid to the Albanian movement. Among the nobles that attended were George Arianiti, Paul Dukagjini, Andrea Thopia, Lekë Dushmani, Teodor Korona, Peter Spani, Lekë Zaharia, and Pal Strez Balsha. Here they formed the League of Lezhë, a confederation of all of the major Albanian princes in alliance against the Ottoman Empire. The chosen captain of this confederation was Skanderbeg. The League's first military challenge came in the spring of 1444, when Skanderbeg's scouts reported that the Ottoman army was planning to invade Albania. Skanderbeg planned to move towards the anticipated entry point and prepared for an engagement.

Campaign

Prelude

Ali Pasha, one of Murad's most favoured commanders, left Üsküp (Skopje) in June 1444 with an army of 25,000–40,000 troops and headed in Albania's direction. Having brought together an army of 15,000 men (8,000 cavalry and 7,000 infantry) from the League of Lezhë, Skanderbeg exhorted to his soldiers the importance of the upcoming campaign. Orders were given for the distribution of soldiers' pay and for religious services to be held. Afterwards, Skanderbeg and his army headed towards the planned place of battle in Lower Dibra, which is thought to be the Plain of Shumbat, then called the Plain of Torvioll, north of Peshkopi. On the way there, he marched through the Black Drin valley and appeared at the expected Ottoman entry point. After camping near Torvioll, Skanderbeg placed 3,000 men under five commanders, Hamza Kastrioti, Muzaka of Angelina, Zecharia Gropa, Peter Emanueli, and Gjon Muzaka, in the surrounding forests with orders to attack the Ottoman wings and rear only after a given signal. While Skanderbeg was preparing his ambush, the Ottoman Turks under Ali Pasha arrived and encamped opposite his forces. The night before the battle, the Ottomans celebrated the coming day, whereas the Albanians extinguished all their campfires and those who were not on guard were directed to rest. Parties of Ottomans made approaches to the Albanian camp and provoked Skanderbeg's soldiers, but they remained quiet. Skanderbeg sent out a scouting party to obtain information about the Ottoman army and ordered his cavalry to engage in small skirmishes.

Albanian positioning
On the morning of 29 June, Skanderbeg arranged his army for battle. Apart from the 3,000 warriors hidden behind the Ottoman army, Skanderbeg left another reserve force of 3,000 under the command of Vrana Konti. The Albanian army was positioned in a crescent shape curving inwards. They were divided into three groups, each composed of 3,000 men. The Albanian left wing was commanded by Tanush Thopia with 1,500 horsemen and an equal number of infantrymen. On the right wing, Skanderbeg placed Moisi Golemi in the same manner as Thopia. In front of the wings, foot archers were placed to lure the Ottomans in. In the center, there were 3,000 men under the command of Skanderbeg and Ajdin Muzaka. One-thousand horsemen were placed in front of the main division with orders to blunt the initial Turkish cavalry charge. An equal number of archers, trained to accompany the horses, was placed next to these horsemen. The main body of infantry, commanded by Ajdin Muzaka, was placed behind the archers.

Battle
After the army was marshaled, Skanderbeg would not permit the trumpets to give the signal for battle until he saw Ali Pasha advancing. An Ottoman body of cavalry charged ahead of the rest, but were repulsed by the Albanians and retreated; suspicious of a feint, Skanderbeg prevented his men from giving chase to the Turks and sent a body of horsemen to marshal his troops back to their places. The same situation occurred on the left wing and, when all were in their places, the army prepared for the main offensive. As it began, the wings were fiercely led on by Thopia and Golemi and pushed back the Ottoman wings. In the centre, Skanderbeg assaulted a selected battalion. When the proper signal was given, the 3,000 horsemen hidden in the woods sprang out and charged into the Ottoman rear, causing large parts of their army to rout. The wings of the Albanian army turned towards the Ottoman centre's flanks. Ajdin Muzaka, having charged the Turkish centre, was met by fierce resistance and the Turks continued to pour in fresh forces until Vrana Konti came in with his reserves and decided the battle. The Turkish army was surrounded. The Ottoman front ranks were annihilated except for 300 soldiers. Ali Pasha's personal battalion fled although the commander nearly met his death.

Aftermath
Between 10,000 to 22,000 Ottoman soldiers died in the battle, while 2,000 more were captured. The Albanians were originally attributed to have lost as few as 120 men, but modern sources suggest a higher figure of 4,000 Albanians dead and wounded. Skanderbeg remained quiet in his camp for the remainder of that day and the following night. Having addressed his troops, he directed his infantry to mount the captured horses. The spoils of the victory were abundant and even the wounded took part in the pillaging. Skanderbeg thereafter ordered a general retreat toward Krujë. Skanderbeg's victory was praised through the rest of Europe. The European states thus began to consider a crusade to drive the Ottomans out of Europe.
The other Albanian noble Gjergj Arianiti in between 1431-1435 had already defeated the Ottomans in 5 battles.
Thus Albanians were the only Europeans who had managed to defeat the Ottomans in several battles and stop their advance.

When Ali Pasha returned to Adrianople (Edirne), he explained to the sultan that the loss should be attributed to his forces and the "fortunes of war" and not his generalship. The Battle of Torvioll thus opened up the almost 40 years of war between Skanderbeg's Albania and the Ottoman Empire.

Notes

References

External links
 Beteja e Torviollit, 1444 - Excerpt from Marin Barleti's Historia de vita et gestis Scanderbegi Epirotarum Principis 
 George Castriot, Surnamed Scanderbeg, King of Albania by Clement Clarke Moore (abridged and modernized translation of a French translation of Marin Barleti's book) - See pages 45–55 for a description of the Battle of Torvioll

Warfare by Skanderbeg
Battles involving the Ottoman Empire
Battles involving Albania
Conflicts in 1444
1444 in the Ottoman Empire